The Christensen Zipper is an air racer that was built to compete in the Goodyear midget air races.

Design and development
The Christensen Zipper was developed by Harvey Christensen and was patterned after Steve Wittman's Bonzo and Buster midget racers.

The Zipper is a single-place, mid-winged aircraft with conventional landing gear. The fuselage was constructed from welded steel tubing with fabric covering. The wing used two wooden spars with strut wire bracing and fabric covering.

Operational history
During the 1948 National Air Races the aircraft was disqualified due to a spar structure inspection.

Christensen flew to third place, but landed one lap early after seeing the checkered flag for a competitor who had lapped him. The Zipper fell to tenth place for landing early.

Specifications (Zipper)

See also

References

Racing aircraft
Homebuilt aircraft
Mid-wing aircraft
Aircraft first flown in 1948